German submarine U-986 was a Type VIIC U-boat of Nazi Germany's Kriegsmarine during World War II.

She was ordered on 25 May 1941, and was laid down on 18 September 1942 at Blohm & Voss, Hamburg, as yard number 186. She was launched on 20 May 1943 and commissioned under the command of Oberleutnant zur See Karl-Ernst Kaiser on 1 July 1943.

Design
German Type VIIC submarines were preceded by the shorter Type VIIB submarines. U-986 had a displacement of  when at the surface and  while submerged. She had two shafts and two  propellers.

U-986 was fitted with five  torpedo tubes (four fitted at the bow and one at the stern), fourteen torpedoes or 26 TMA mines, one  SK C/35 naval gun, 220 rounds, and one twin  C/30 anti-aircraft gun. The boat had a complement of between 44 — 52 men.

Service history
On 8 February 1944, U-986 left Kiel on her first war patrol, sailing through the Iceland passage en route to the North Atlantic. U-986 reported on 10 April 1944 for the last time, stating that she would be commencing her return in two days, at that time U-986 was ordered to Lorient but when she failed to arrive in port she was posted missing on 20 April 1944, all hands, 50 crewmen, lost.

Last known location .

Wolfpacks
U-986 took part in one wolfpack, namely:
 Preussen (2 – 22 March 1944)

References

External links

Bibliography

German Type VIIC submarines
U-boats commissioned in 1943
World War II submarines of Germany
Ships built in Hamburg
1943 ships
Maritime incidents in April 1944
World War II shipwrecks in the North Sea
Missing U-boats of World War II